The American rug industry began in the second half of the 19th century. Although Americans had been importing European rugs via England since the colonists landed in Massachusetts, tariffs after the Revolutionary War diminished the importation business. Replacing English importations were American manufactories established in southern New England.

The history of rugs in America is extensive; however, today hooked rugs and Navajo rugs are synonymous with American rug design. Settlers who were working with limited resources developed hooked rugs in the 17th century. The rugs continued to be popular through the 19th century. The design motifs on early American hooked rugs varied, consisting predominantly of geometric patterns, floral designs, landscapes, seascapes and animals. No matter what the motif, hooked rugs displayed a great sense of individual expression.

References 
Neff, Ivan C. and Carol V. Maggs. Dictionary of Oriental Rugs. London: AD. Donker LTD, 1977. 
Gardiner, Roger F. "Spuhler Revisited: Further Thoughts on the West Berlin Rug Catalog." November, 1988.[1].
Sherrill, Sarah B."Carpets and Rugs of Europe and America."New York: Abbeville Press, 1996. 
Black, David. "The Atlas of Rugs and Carpets."London:Tiger Books, 1996. 
Ford, P.R.J. "Oriental Carpet Design."Thames and Hudson, London.1989. 

Rugs and carpets